The 2018–19 Gamma Ethniki is the 36th season since the official establishment of the third tier of Greek football in 1983.
It start on 30 September 2018. This year 12 teams will be promoted. After the finish of the eight groups, the first team of each group will be promoted to Football League and then the 8 runner-up teams after draw will play two legs to determine which four teams will be promoted. 

107 teams are divided into eight groups according to geographical criteria.

Neos Amfilochos, Doxa Kranoula, APO Kanaris Nenita, AO Panthyreatikos, AO Potamia Megalo Chorio, AE Vathyllou Pansamiakou and Aigiros Mystegnon withdrew from the league before the group draw.

Group 1

Teams

Standings

Group 2

Teams

Standings

Group 3

Teams

Standings

Group 4

Teams

Standings

Group 5

Teams

Standings

Group 6

Teams

Standings

Group 7

Teams

Standings

Group 8

Teams

Standings

Promotional Play off
First leg will be played on 5 May the second leg on 12 May.

References

Third level Greek football league seasons
3
Greece